Pyaar Ka Dard Hai Meetha Meetha Pyaara Pyaara is an Indian drama television series produced by Rajshri Productions. It aired from 18 June 2012 to 1 November 2014 on Star Plus. It starred Disha Parmar and Nakuul Mehta as Pankhuri Gupta Kumar and Aditya Kumar.

Plot
Pankhuri Gupta is a small town simple girl from Kullu. Aditya Kumar, a rich boy in Mumbai has grown up cynical about relationships having seen his parents Avantika and Harish separated for 20 years.
Purushottam Deewan (Aditya's maternal grandfather), a wealthy business tycoon, visits the Guptas in Kullu, determining to get Pankhuri married to Aditya.

Instead, Avantika fixes Aditya's engagement to the Mumbai-based Latika Bafna who only wants the Deewans money. Latika frames Aditya for taking advantage of her but Pankhuri proves his innocence & rebukes latika for her lies against Aditya. Aditya and Pankhuri become best friends. Pankhuri's parents  fix Pankhuri's marriage to Shivam Mehta. Latika tries to ruin the wedding prompting Shivam to leave. Aditya steps in and marries Pankhuri, and Avantika eventually accepts her as her daughter-in-law wholeheartedly after seeing her unconditional efforts to reunite her with her husband Harish. .
Rubel (Anuj's son) comes to India. He is a spoiled brat and just despises Aditya as he believes he is too good & more emotionally attached to Purushottam & gets more things whatever he wants more than him  and wants the family business and property. 
Rubel marries Latika in a contract marriage for the property. Sheela, Latika plan and successfully brainwash Anuj for property and make him acquire the power of attorney. They together plot against Aditya and Pankhuri and get them ousted out of  the Deewan mansion. They later fire Shanky. Kaira (Anuj's daughter) fears & lives in a misconception that  Purushottam killed his wife Kaushalya. This misunderstanding is cleared after many complicated truths. 
At a young age, Aditya was accidentally responsible for the death of Kaushalya who was in a state of coma. After learning the truth, Kaira apologises to Purushottam. The Deewans are reunited after many ups and downs. Anuj starts showing love and cares for his father Purushottam and sisters Avantika and Preeti by handing the reins of the business to Avantika and Aditya, that he'd usurped. Preeti gets married to Sameer Deshpande. 

Purushottam passes away peacefully after uniting his family with Pankhuri's painstaking efforts. Purushottam's younger brother Manik and his family invite themselves to live in Deewan Mansion after the former's death.

Latika joins Manik and his wife Manorama in their ulterior plans and undergoes an abortion but feigns a miscarriage blaming Pankhuri, which is later revealed to Rubel of latika's true colours leading to Rubel changing himself & becoming a better & positive person. Aditya is jailed, framed for possessing fake notes and illegal drugs,proved innocent after sometime as Aditya relentlessly sticks to the truth that he didn't do anything unethical nor does he did ever possess fake notes and illegal drugs. He is compelled by the wicked Manorama to divorce Pankhuri to save Rubel , Aditya-Pankhuri get divorced for few days till the true colours of Manik , Manorama & Kapil are out, Manik and Manorama reform after Manorama becomes paralyzed due to accident and realize all the wrongdoings they caused to everyone in the family ,feels sorry for their wrongdoings Rubel divorces Latika, and falls in love with, and marries Payal. Pankhuri and Aditya remarry with all rituals in a grand way. Kapil (Manik's son) gets arrested, Kaira marries Varun.

The family reunites with Aneesha (the late Kaushalya's younger sister) who returns from Australia after decades. Vikram (Varun's elder brother) wants to use Kaira for revenge on Deewans as a decision by Avantika affects him negatively. The family eventually settles the problem. Aditya and Pankhuri have a tiff . While she goes off to Kullu, they sort out the tiff and patch  over the phone and have special conversation just before Pankhuri falls of a cliff due to landslide.

2 years later

Harish meets Pankhuri's lookalike Ayesha on a trip in Lucknow and uses her to bring Aditya out of the belief that Pankhuri is still alive but the plan flops. Aditya realises Ayesha isn't Pankhuri and still believes that Pankhuri is alive. Ayesha falls in love with him, but keeps her feelings to herself aware of the fact that Aditya only loves Pankhuri .Ayesha's mother Nilofer forces Aditya to marry her, after Ayesha's image is tarnished by a photographer Arif .

He marries her; to save her dignity and respect,.she is soon accepted by Avantika. Alive, Pankhuri is brought back to deewan mansion in the state of coma. On waking up, she reveals being abducted for jewellery. The culprits are caught. Ayesha leaves to pursue her dream of becoming a designer , after seeing that Aditya was ,is and will always be only Pankhuri's Adi & only and only love Pankhuri, none can replace her ,decides to free him from bond of marriage which he did to save her dignity and image in the society .Aneesha accompanies her as she considers Ayesha like her daughter.Avantika's past affair is revealed when her illegitimate son Ayush comes to live with the Deewan family.

Eventually, Harish accepts Ayush as his stepson. The show ends on a happy note with Pankhuri turning pregnant and everyone in the family reuniting and rejoicing: thus, fulfilling the dream of being a united and happy family that the late Purushottam Deewan had always dreamt of.

Cast

Main
 Disha Parmar as 
Pankhuri Gupta Kumar: Ambika and Diwakar's daughter; Aditya's wife (2012–2014)
Ayesha Khan Kumar:(Twins Looksalike) Nilofer's daughter; Nafisa and Rukhsaar's sister; Aditya's second wife who realises Adi from the bond of marriage seeing his undying love for Pankhuri and ends the marriage mutually and remains good friends with Aditya -Pankhuri (2014)
 Nakuul Mehta as Aditya Kumar: Avantika and Harish's son; Ayush's half-brother; Pankhuri's husband (2012–2014)

Recurring

 Kanwarjit Paintal as Jagdish Prasad Gupta: Puru's friend; Mohina's husband; Diwakar, Pushkar and Kailash's father; Pankhuri and Neha's grandfather (2012–2014)
 Mukesh Khanna as Purushottam "Puru" Deewan: Manik's elder brother; Jagdish's friend; Kaushalya's husband; Anuj, Avantika and Preeti's father; Aditya, Rubel and Kaira's grandfather (2012–2013)
 Rita Bhaduri as Mohina Gupta: Jagdish's wife; Diwakar, Pushkar and Kailash's mother; Pankhuri and Neha's grandmother (2012)
 Kunwar Aziz Ustahi as Diwakar Gupta: Mohina and Jagdish's eldest son; Pushkar and Kailash's brother; Ambika's husband; Pankhuri's father (2012–2014)
 Leena Prabhu as Ambika Kaneria Gupta: Govardhan and Deepak's sister; Diwakar's wife; Pankhuri's mother (2012–2014)
 Faizal Qureshi as Pushkar Gupta: Mohina and Jagdish's second son; Diwakar and Kailash's brother; Sushma's husband; Neha's father (2012–2014)
 Ajita Kulkarni as Sushma Gupta: Pushkar's wife; Neha's mother (2012–2014)
 Abir Goswami/Vimarsh Roshan as Kailash Gupta: Mohina and Jagdish's youngest son; Diwakar and Pushkar's brother; Preeti's ex-lover; Vedika's husband (2012–2014)
 Prerna Bhatt as Vedika Gupta: Kailash's wife (2012–2014)
 Manish Khanna as Govardhan Kaneria: Ambika and Deepak's brother; Kamini's husband (2012-2014)
 Bharti Sharma as Kamini Kaneria: Govardhan's wife (2012-2014)
 Shreya Arora/Urmila Tiwari as Neha Gupta Kapur: Sushma and Pushkar's daughter; Naman's wife (2012–2013)
 Anubhav Krishna Srivastava as Naman Kapur: Shivam's brother; Neha's husband (2012–2013)
 Nandita Puri as Kaushalya Deewan: Anisha's elder sister; Puru's wife; Avantika, Anuj and Preeti's mother; Aditya, Rubel and Kaira's grandmother (2012-2014)
 Manasi Salvi as Avantika Deewan Kumar: Puru and Kaushalya's daughter; Anuj and Preeti's sister; Harish's wife; Ayush and Aditya's mother (2012–2014)
 Nitesh Pandey as Harish Kumar: Sukhmani's son; Sareeka's brother; Avantika's husband; Aditya's father; Ayush's step-father (2012–2014)
 Nikhil Sharma as Ayush Malhotra: Avantika's son; Harish's step-son; Aditya's half-brother (2014)
 Mehul Buch as Anuj Deewan: Puru and Kaushalya's son; Avantika and Preeti's brother; Sheela's husband; Rubel and Kaira's father (2012–2014)
 Sonali Naik as Sheela Deewan: Anuj's wife; Rubel and Kaira's mother (2012–2014)
Khushwant Walia as Rubel Deewan: Sheela and Anuj's son; Kaira's brother; Latika's ex-husband; Payal's husband (2012–2014)
 Monica Khanna as Payal Deewan: Deepak's daughter; Rubel's second wife (2013–2014)
 Prinal Oberoi as Kaira Deewan Dhanrajgir: Sheela and Anuj's daughter; Rubel's sister; Manan's ex-girlfriend; Varun's wife (2012–2014)
 Prashant Upadhyay as Varun Dhanrajgir: Vikram's brother; Kaira's husband (2013–2014)
 Ashlesha Sawant as Preeti Deshpande: Kaushalya and Purushottam's daughter; Avantika and Anuj's younger sister; Kailash's ex-lover; Sameer's wife (2012–2014)
 Vijayendra Kumeria as Sameer Deshpande: Nirmala and Sadanand's son; Preeti's husband (2013–2014)
 Mehmood Junior as Shankar Chattopadhyay (Shanky): Deewans' caretaker and Puru's aide (2012–2014)
 Meenkashi Sethi as Sukhmani Kumar: Harish and Sareeka's mother; Aditya and Payal's grandmother (2012–2014)
 Yashashri Chiplunker as Payal Sharma: Sareeka's daughter (2013–2014)
 Prateek Shukla as Shivam Kapur: Naman's brother; Pankhuri's ex-fiancé (2012)
Alefia Kapadia as Latika Bafna Deewan: Nisha's daughter; Aditya's ex-fiancé; Rubel's ex-wife (2012–2014)
 Priyanka Nayyar as Nisha Bafna: Latika's mother (2012–2013)
 Worship Khanna as Toby (2013)
 Nivaan Sen as Sahil (2013)
 Raj Singh Suryavanshi as Manan Modi: Kaira's ex-boyfriend (2013)
 Rajlaxmi Solanki as Nirmala Deshpande: Sadanand's wife; Sameer's mother; Kaushalya's nurse (2013–2014)
 Kuldeep Mallik as Sadanand Deshpande: Nirmala's husband; Sameer's father (2013–2014)
 Apurva Agnihotri as Vikram Dhanrajgir: Varun's brother; Amrita's husband (2014)
 Aleeza Khan as Amrita Dhanrajgir: Vikram's wife (2014)
 Kunika as Aneesha James Waterson: Kaushalya's younger sister; Puru's sister-in-law; Anuj, Avantika, Preeti's maternal aunt (2014)
 Anil Dhawan as Manik Deewan: Puru's brother; Manorama's husband; Kapil and Revati's father (2013)
 Suchitra Bandekar as Manorama Deewan: Manik's second wife; Kapil and Revati's step-mother (2013)
 Alekh Sangal as Kapil Deewan: Manik's son; Manorama's step-son; Revati's brother; Anuradha's husband (2013)
 Harsha Khandeparkar as Anuradha "Roshni" Deewan: Kapil's wife (2013)
 Sonali Nikam as Revati Deewan: Manik's daughter; Manorama's step-daughter; Kapil's sister (2013)
Mridul Kumar Sinha as Mr. Goel, Sheela Deewan's elder brother (2014)
 Aparna Ghoshal as Nilofer Khan: Nafisa, Ayesha and Rukhsaar's mother (2014)
 Monica Murthy as Rukhsaar Khan: Nilofer's daughter; Ayesha and Nafisa's sister (2014)
 Divjot Sabarwal as Nafisa Khan: Nilofer's daughter; Ayesha and Rukhsaar's sister (2014)

References

External links
 Official Website on hotstar

StarPlus original programming
Indian television series
Indian television soap operas
Serial drama television series
2012 Indian television series debuts
Television shows set in Himachal Pradesh
Television shows set in Mumbai